This article lists internationally distributed films that:
 were shot on location in the city of Budapest, capital of Hungary
 use the city of Budapest as a set to portray other cities
 have the story or part of the story set in Budapest, but were not shot there
 if they are animated films, have Budapest as their identifiable venue

Since the 1990s, Budapest has been home to many international film productions. More recently the level of filming has increased, and at peak times up to three or four films will be in shooting. The reasons for this were given by film producer André Szőts in lectures given at the Eötvös Loránd University and in a 2004 television interview on Hungarian television TV2. According to Szőts, Hungary provides for a relatively cheap budget (e.g. salaries are much lower than just about anywhere in the West), and Budapest has kept the image of a city that is so diverse in building types from different eras that it could be substituted for (or disguised to be) any large European city. Szőts has given an example of a French film he produced in which Budapest was a set for 30 different cities.

Music videos shot in Budapest

 Arash: Pure Love
 Clueso: Mitnehm
 David Deejay: So Bizarre
 Mylène Farmer: Désenchantée (1991)
 Groove Coverage: Moonlight Shadow
 Michael Jackson - HIStory teaser, venue: Budapest, Hősök tere (1995)
Madonna: Don't Cry For Me Argentina (1996) (venue: Andrassy Avenue)
 Sarah Connor: From Sarah with Love (2001) (venue: Keleti ("Eastern") railway station)
Jovanotti: Mi fido di te
 Lenny Kravitz: Dancing Till Dawn
 Liberty X: Holding On For You
 maNga: Cevapsız Sorular
 Ziggi Recado: Need To Tell You This
 Ela Rose featuring David Deejay: I Can Feel
 Jolin Tsai: "A Wonder in Madrid"
 Jamie Woon: Lady Luck
 Daniel Docherty: Hold Me
The Chemical Brothers: "The Boxer" (2005)
Gwen Stefani: "Early Winter" (2006) (venues: Nyugati ("Western") railway station, inside the waiting room of Queen Elisabeth and Franz Joseph)
 Katy Perry: "Firework" (2010) (venues: Castle Quarter, rooftop at Astoria)
Selena Gomez & the Scene: "Round & Round" (2010) (venues: Parliament, Hungarian State Opera, Hungarian State Opera House, Danubius Hotel Astoria, Arcades of Dob street, Széchenyi Chain Bridge, Buda Castle, Buda Castle Quarter, Fisherman's Bastion, Danube Promenade, Trams in Budapest, Nyugati Rail Hub area)
George Ezra: "Budapest" (2013) (lyrics portray Budapest, music video not shot in Budapest)
Teen Top: "Missing" (2014) 
Davichi: Sorry I'm Happy (2015)
Deepside Deejays: Amo Never Be Alone (2015)
Avicii: "For a Better Day" (2015)
Avicii: "Pure Grinding" (2015)
 Ellie Goulding, Diplo, Swae Lee: "Close To Me" (2018) (venues: Fisherman's Bastion, Buda Castle, Castle Garden Bazaar, Gellért Baths)
Will Smith, Nicky Jam, Era Istrefi, Diplo, Ronaldinho: "Live It Up (Official Song 2018 FIFA World Cup Russia)" (2018) (venues: Nagyvásártelep, K-bridge at Hajógyári Island, Óbuda, 1052 Budapest, Károly körút 28.)
Hwang Min-hyun (Minhyun from NU'EST): Universe (2019)

Films and series shot in Budapest

Films set in Budapest
The following films or television series episodes had a plot or part of a plot set in Budapest but were not shot on location. 
 Ladies in Love (1936) - with Tyrone Power (billed as Tyrone Power Jr.), Janet Gaynor, Loretta Young, Constance Bennett and Don Ameche. Three women rent a luxury apartment in Budapest while in search of wealthy husbands. 
 The Shop Around the Corner (1940) - with James Stewart, Margaret Sullavan and Frank Morgan. Two employees of a Budapest shop clash with each other, neither knowing that the other is the unmet lover they have been corresponding with.
 MacGyver Season 1 Episode 3, "The Thief of Budapest" (1985) - In this episode Budapest looks like a mixture of a city in Turkey and one in Italy. Also, Budapest is set to be a five-minute drive away from the Austrian border, when in reality it is about 200 kilometres away.
 Van Helsing (2004) - Important pieces of plot take place in the Budapest of the 1890s, which was only shown as a background image which merged artist's concepts with a contemporary tourist photograph of the city.
Burn Notice (2007-2013): multiple episodes including season 1, episode 11 "Dead Drop" (2007) - numerous mentions of Budapest, used as part of the plot. 
The Avengers (2012): Scarlett Johansson (Natasha Romanoff aka Black Widow) and Jeremy Renner (Clint Barton aka Hawkeye) mention Budapest numerous times, used as part of the plot.
Avengers: Endgame (2019): Scarlett Johansson (Natasha Romanoff aka Black Widow) and Jeremy Renner (Clint Barton aka Hawkeye) mention Budapest numerous times, used as part of the plot.
MTV Europe Music Awards (2020): Budapest and London were both the virtual host cities for the EMAs 2020.

Animated films featuring Budapest

 Willy the Sparrow (1989)
 The District! (2004)
Hotel Transylvania movie franchise (2012-2021)

See also 
 :Category:Films shot in Hungary
 :Category:Television shows filmed in Hungary

Sources 

Films
Films
Films
Bupapest